"Exotic" is a song composed by Bruce Morgan and recorded by various bands back in 1963 when it was first released.

Morgan is more known for having written songs like "Surfer Girl" and "Luau" for The Beach Boys.

Known recordings

 1963 - The Sentinals recorded "Exotic" in their album "Big Surf!" for Del-Fi Records
 1963 - Bob Vaught & The Renegaids recorded "Exotic" as a 7" Single, with "Surfin' Tragedy" as a B-side for GNP Crescendo
 1963 - The Rhythm Kings recorded "Exotic" as a B-side for their single "Blue Soul", also from  GNP Crescendo. This same track was later re-released by the same publisher in a compilation album named "Original Surfin' Hits" and again in a 1964 compilation titled "Dance With The Jet Set! At The World's Great Discotheques"
 1986 - The Raunch Hands recorded "Exotic" for their album "Learn To Whap-A-Dang" for Relativity Records
 1994 - The Del Lagunas Exotic B/W Twine Time - 7" Single - Sympathy For The Record Industry
 1995 - Dave Myers And The Surftones -  Surf War: The Battle Of The Surf Groups  - Sundazed Music
 1996 - The El Caminos - Surfers' Lounge - Sexcite Records
 1996 - Los Kogars - Swing Into Action (LP, Album)	Planet Pimp Records
 1998 - The Krontjong Devils - On Tour!!! - Telstar Records
 1999 - Surf Report - Lavarockreverb (CD-ROM + Album) Rickshaw Records
 1999 - The Infrareds - (self-titled album) Blue Mule Music
 2012 - The Original Surfaris - "Lost Legends Of Surf Guitar" (compilation) - Sundazed Music

1963 songs